Miguel Nazar Haro (26 September 1924 – 26 January 2012) was the head of Mexico's Dirección Federal de Seguridad (Federal Security Directorate) from 1978 to 1982. He started his career working for the secret-police chief Fernando Gutiérrez Barrios. During his time in the DFS, Nazar Haro and the Directorate were involved in the Mexican government's so called Dirty War, a series of state-crimes against leftist insurgents, social movements and the government's political opposition.

He was arrested in 2004 on charges stemming from the disappearance of a group of alleged guerrillas. In 2006, these charges were dropped.

References 

1924 births
2012 deaths
People from Mexico City
Federal political office-holders in Mexico
People from Pánuco, Veracruz